Oxford Street is a major thoroughfare in Sydney, New South Wales, Australia, running from Whitlam Square on the south-east corner of Hyde Park in the central business district (CBD) of Sydney to Bondi Junction in the Eastern Suburbs. Close to the CBD in particular, the street is lined with numerous shops, bars and nightclubs. After the 1980s, Oxford Street garnered a reputation as Sydney's primary nightclub strip (firstly gay nightclubs in the 1980s followed by straight nightclubs in the 2000s) and subsequently saw a large increase in the number of crimes committed in the area. However, the 2014 lockout laws saw many nightclubs close and the crime rate drop as Sydney's nightlife hubs moved to Darling Harbour and Newtown. The lockout laws ended in 2020 with a focus on small bars and restaurants. Many nightclubs reopened in 2021 especially around Taylor Square.

The western section of Oxford Street, which runs through the suburb of Darlinghurst, is widely recognised as Sydney's main gay district and Oxford Street is closed to traffic once a year in early March for the Sydney Gay and Lesbian Mardi Gras. Specifically, the area of Oxford Street between Hyde Park and Paddington Town Hall became known from the early 1980s as 'The Golden Mile' because of the growing density of popular venues for the gay community. The section to the east of Taylor Square, running through the suburb of Paddington forms an upmarket shopping strip and represents the home of the new medical faculty of the University of Notre Dame Australia as well as the University of New South Wales' College of Fine Arts, Victoria Barracks, Paddington Bazaar and St Vincent's Hospital, Sydney amongst other locations.

History

The project was carried out in five stages between 1910 and 1914. The result was a new boulevard and the creation of a Federation streetscape which remains today largely intact.

Trams to Bondi and Bronte beaches travelled down Oxford Street until the line was closed in 1960, replaced by the current bus service.

Paddington Reservoir

Located on the corner of Oatley Road and Oxford Street is the Paddington Reservoir, a water reservoir which provided water to the Botany Swamps pumping station for the provision of water to parts of Sydney between 1866 and 1899. In 2006 work began to restore and reuse the space of the then derelict Paddington Reservoir. The facility reopened in 2008 as a sunken garden known as the Paddington Reservoir Gardens or Walter Read Reserve, with a rooftop reserve located above the preserved eastern chamber. The facility integrates the remains of the original brick, timber and iron structure with modern elements of sculptural, structural and functional significance which provide access to the sunken garden via stairs and an elevator as well as ramped access to the rooftop reserve.

Victoria Barracks

Victoria Barracks, located in Oxford Street, houses the Headquarters Forces Command (Australia), as well as the Army Museum of NSW which is housed in the original District Military Prison, constructed in 1800. The barracks was constructed of Hawkesbury sandstone by way of convict labour between 1841 and 1846. 

The Barracks were originally occupied by regiments of the British Army who vacated the site in 1870.  The Barracks was the premier military training site in Australia until 1901.
For a brief period during the 1930s Victoria Barracks was home to the Royal Military College, Duntroon when the College was forced to close its buildings in Canberra and relocate to Sydney due to the economic downturn caused by the Great Depression.

Heritage buildings
The following buildings are on the Register of the National Estate:

 Victoria Barracks (1841–48)
 Paddington Town Hall (1890–91)
 Paddington Public School (1870 and 1892 buildings)
 Uniting Church and Parsonage (1877)
 St Matthias Church Group (1859–61)
 Former St Mattias Rectory (1873)
 St Matthias Church Hall (1882)
 Post Office (1885)

Oxford Street Mall 

The pedestrian-only zone of Oxford Street between Bronte Road and Newland Street, Bondi Junction was converted into a pedestrian mall in 1979 when the Eastern Suburbs railway line opened. Prior to the 1960 trams ran along that stretch of Oxford Street. Oxford Street Mall was an alternative to shopping at the nearby shopping centres as it was once home Waltons department store, Flemings and Woolworths Supermarkets and a Timezone arcade. However these stores have since disappeared prior to the 1990s.

Oxford Street Mall is home to numerous shops and cafes and is an entry to many small arcades and shopping centres that are located on this stretch including Meriton Retail Precinct Bondi Junction, Bronka Arcade and The Royal Arcade. Bondi Junction railway station can be accessed through the Meriton Retail Precinct on Rowe Street. Bronka and The Royal Arcade provides direct pedestrian passage way to Spring Street and Eastgate Bondi Junction. Westfield Bondi Junction is located on the Bronte Road end of Oxford Street Mall.

In 2003, Waverley Council upgraded the Oxford Street pedestrian mall and embarked on a general upgrade of streets and footpaths in the commercial area. The upgrade included new footpath tiles, addition of shade sails over new inground rondels and artificial 'tram tracks' along the entire mall, paving text as cast inlays and glass bead blasting into paving and as well as suspended art installations. The artificial tram tracks are the main features of the mall that commemorate the actual tram line that previously passed through.

Since 2013 there were plans for a light rail to Bondi Beach going along Oxford Street Mall. However in November 2017 Waverley Council had voted to reject any proposals for a light rail along Oxford Street or Bondi Road in favour of local businesses.

Oxford Street Cycleway 
After the 2023 WorldPride festival a bidirectional separated cycleway will be constructed between Taylor Square and Hyde Park on Oxford street. 

The City of Sydney announced the original design for a bidirectional centre running "pop up" cycleway in November 2020. After further consultation they announced a new design running on the north edge of the street.

According to the City of Sydney, about 2000 people per day ride along Oxford Street amongst traffic on the 6 lane road.

Oxford Street revival

2011 
On 27 June 2011, the Lord Mayor of Sydney, Clover Moore proposed new directions for lower Oxford Street, and on 22 August 2011 the Council resolved to undertake a number of short, medium and long term initiatives to activate City owned properties in the precinct. After an Expression of Interest (EOI) was put out for creative and cultural organisations to occupy a vacant city owned property, 16 organisations were announced as being successful applicants and were granted office space as part of the Sydney 2030 plan to revitalise the Oxford Street Precinct with creative and cultural organisations that could help to drive foot traffic to the area as well as promote the community. The 16 organisations that were part of this programme were:

 AroundYou (formerly AroundYou Pty Limited)
 The Fortynine
 SCALE Architecture
 Queer ScreenMusic NSW
 Sydney Guild
 Dr Egg

 New Media Production Group 
 Homework
 EngineRoom by Fishburners
 Rouse Phillips Textile Studio
 PROVINCE
 Envelop Entertainment

 World Famous Westsyde
 He Made She Made
 Platform72
 Under New Management

2021- 
The City of City unveiled a plan to "breathe new life" into the strip by updating the zoning rules along the strip, including increasing building height limits if developers comply with including community focused uses in the building.

See also

 DIY rainbow crossing

References

External links

Streets in Sydney
Pedestrian malls in Australia
Shopping districts and streets in Australia
Gay villages in Australia
LGBT culture in Sydney
Paddington, New South Wales
Darlinghurst, New South Wales
Surry Hills, New South Wales